A list of films produced in Spain in 1968 (see 1968 in film).

1968

References

Footnotes

Sources

External links
 Spanish films of 1968 at the Internet Movie Database

1968
Spanish
Films